Claude Vautrin House is a historic home and farm complex located at Cape Vincent in Jefferson County, New York.  The limestone farmhouse is a two-story structure with a square main block with a hipped roof and a one-story wooden rear wing with a gable roof, built in 1855 in the Italianate style.  Also on the property are six contributing 19th century outbuildings: a barn with a silo, four sheds, and a smokehouse.

It was listed on the National Register of Historic Places in 1985.

References

Houses on the National Register of Historic Places in New York (state)
Italianate architecture in New York (state)
Houses completed in 1855
Houses in Jefferson County, New York
National Register of Historic Places in Jefferson County, New York